This is a list of historic building in Markham, Ontario, Canada. The earliest structures that were built in Markham, Ontario originated from indigenous settlements in the region, including the Iroquois, the Huron Wendat, the Petun and the Neutral Nation. However, Markham's oldest standing structures dates back to its earliest European settlers, who settled the area in 1794.

The following article is a list of historic buildings in Markham up to 1850.

Existing historic buildings
Most historic structures and properties are presently registered with the Markham Register of Property of Cultural Heritage Value or Interest. A number of buildings and properties listed on the registry are protected under the Ontario Heritage Act. Buildings and structures in the registry are either listed as individual properties, or as a part of a larger heritage conservation district. The oldest structure listed on the registry is Philip Eckardt Log House, built in 1800. 

The majority of Markham's oldest standing structures were built as private residences, many of which are still used for that purpose. However, some residences have been re-purposed for commercial use.

Location
Historic buildings and structures are spread throughout Markham, although several historic buildings are clustered in four "heritage conservation districts," Buttonville, Markham Village, Thornhill, and Unionville. Developments in the heritage conservation districts is required to follow municipal guidelines laid out in the heritage district's conservation plan. These conservation plans were created to protect historic buildings, and to ensure that new developments within these districts complement the "character of the neighbourhood".

In addition to the heritage conservation districts, other clusters of heritage buildings are also situated at the Markham Museum and Markham Heritage Estates. The former is an open-air local history museum; while the latter serves as the city's "subdivision last resort", an area reserved for relocated heritage buildings that cannot be retained on their existing site. The museum and subdivision are both situated near the Markham Village heritage conservation district, although they do not form a part of said district.

List of historic buildings in Markham
The following is a list of the oldest buildings in Markham that are still erect, up to 1850, as listed by the Markham Register of Property of Cultural Heritage Value or Interest:

List of early demolished buildings
The following were notable buildings and structures that were erected in Markham by 1850, but were later demolished:

See also
 History of Markham, Ontario
 List of oldest buildings in Canada

Notes

References

External links
 Markham Heritage Property Search
 Markham Museum and Historic Village
 Markham Village Heritage Conservation District - Canada's Historic Places

National Historic Sites in Ontario
Buildings and structures in Markham, Ontario
Markham